James Zimmerman may refer to:
 James Edward Zimmerman, co-inventor of the radio-frequency superconducting quantum interference device (SQUID)
 James Fulton Zimmerman, American historian and professor of political science

See also
 James Zimmermann, British tennis player